is a Japanese voice actor whose notable roles include series like Ouran High School Host Club and Trinity Blood.

Filmography

Video games

Drama CDs

Television animation

Dubbing
All the Boys Love Mandy Lane, Red (Aaron Himelstein)
Mr. & Mrs. Smith (2010 TV Asahi edition), Benjamin "The Tank" Danz (Adam Brody)

References

External links
 Official agency profile 
 

Japanese male voice actors
Living people
1976 births
People from Hirosaki